"The 7th Sense" is the debut single by South Korean boy group NCT U, the first sub-unit of NCT. It was released on April 9, 2016, through SM Entertainment. Musically, "The 7th Sense" was described as a future bass genre based on hip-hop grooves, with heavy bass sounds and dreamy vocals and rap.

Background and release 

On January 28, 2016, SM Entertainment founder Lee Soo-man delivered a presentation at the SM Coex Artium, titled "SMTOWN: New Culture Technology 2016." The label's plan was to debut a new boy group with an "unlimited" number of members with their "culture contents" strategy. They released a video called "SM_NCT#2 Synchronization of your dreams" where Taeyong, Hansol, Ten, Mark, and Jaehyun performed a dance, there was a song teaser vocal by Taeyong, Doyoung, Jaehyun, Mark, & Haechan. The music video for "The 7th Senses" was released on April 8, 2016, released on SMTOWN's official YouTube Channel.

Composition 
In an interview, the composer said he was curious about the new idol group's debut with the song and that a foreign reaction would be good. On the last day of the SM songwriting camp, a composer put out a beat, which came out very well, and eight or nine composers made it. Taeyong and Mark participated in rap making. The lyrics introduce the NCT score keyword, "Seventh Sense," which means a sense of feeling and understanding each other's dreams through music. It contains NCT's desire and aspiration to communicate powerfully with the public in the future.

Accolades

Charts

Release history

References 

2016 songs
2016 debut singles
NCT (band) songs
SM Entertainment singles